Circinaria calcarea is a species of crustose lichen in the family Megasporaceae. It was first described as a new species by Carl Linnaeus in his 1753 work Species Plantarum. Linnaeus named it Lichen calcareus, as he classified all lichens in the eponymously named genus. The species has had an extensive taxonomic history, resulting in dozens of synonyms. In 2010, it was placed in its current genus, Circinaria, following molecular phylogenetic analysis of the Megasporaceae.

Circinaria calcarea has a cosmopolitan distribution, having been recorded from the Arctic, Asia, Australasia, Europe, Oceania, Central America, South America, and North America. It is a saxicolous lichen, and grows on calcareous, calciferous, and basic rock.

References

Pertusariales
Lichen species
Lichens of Asia
Lichens of Australia
Lichens of Europe
Lichens of Oceania
Lichens of Central America
Lichens of South America
Lichens of North America
Lichens described in 1753
Taxa named by Carl Linnaeus
Lichens of the Arctic